Glen Thomas Brumby (born 11 May 1960) is a former Australian professional squash player.

Born in Maylands, South Australia, Brumby was a world's top ten player and represented Australia in the 1979, 1981 & 1985 World Team Squash Championships.

References

External links
 

Australian male squash players
1960 births
Living people